Alexander George Dickson (1834 – 4 July 1889) was a British Conservative Party politician who served as the Member of Parliament in the British House of Commons for Dover.

Dickson was born at Belchester, a stately home in Berwickshire, Scotland in 1834. He joined the 13th Light Dragoons in 1853 and reached the rank of Major. In 1863 he became Captain in the Royal East Kent Regiment of Mounted Rifles Yeomanry Cavalry. He stood for parliament at Dover in 1865 and retained the seat until his death in 1889.

He married as her second husband Charlotte Maria Eden, widow of Dudley North, Lord North, son of Francis North, 6th Earl of Guilford.

References

External links 
 

1834 births
1889 deaths
13th Hussars officers
Conservative Party (UK) MPs for English constituencies
UK MPs 1865–1868
UK MPs 1868–1874
UK MPs 1874–1880
UK MPs 1880–1885
UK MPs 1885–1886
UK MPs 1886–1892
Members of the Parliament of the United Kingdom for Dover